Fenton Township is located in Whiteside County, Illinois, United States. As of the 2010 census, its population was 536 and it contained 236 housing units.

Geography

Demographics

References

External links

City-data.com
Whiteside County Official Site
History of Fenton Township, 1877

Townships in Whiteside County, Illinois
Townships in Illinois